Eliot Glacier is a glacier on the northeastern slopes of Mount Hood in the U.S. state of Oregon. The glacier's situation on a northeast slope, its higher altitude accumulation zone close to the summit of Mount Hood and its high level of talus debris may explain its slower retreat.

See also
List of glaciers in the United States

References

Glaciers of Mount Hood
Glaciers of Hood River County, Oregon
Mount Hood National Forest
Glaciers of Oregon